Joaquim Alberto Castanheira de Melo (born 11 September 1949) is a Portuguese former footballer who played as a goalkeeper.

Club career
Born in Coimbra, Melo appeared in 276 Primeira Liga matches over 15 seasons, representing in the competition C.F. União de Coimbra, C.F. Os Belenenses (two stints), Vitória de Guimarães, Sporting CP and C.F. Estrela da Amadora. In 1981–82, he contributed two appearances to help Sporting win the national championship as backup to Ferenc Mészáros.

Melo was in goal during the 1990 Taça de Portugal Final, as Estrela won its first and only trophy after defeating S.C. Farense 2–0 in the replay match. After 24 games in the following league campaign (the team finished third from bottom and could not avoid relegation), he retired at the age of 41.

Honours
Sporting
Primeira Liga: 1981–82

Estrela da Amadora
Taça de Portugal: 1989–90

References

External links

1949 births
Living people
Sportspeople from Coimbra
Portuguese footballers
Association football goalkeepers
Primeira Liga players
Liga Portugal 2 players
C.F. Os Belenenses players
Vitória S.C. players
Sporting CP footballers
C.F. União players
C.F. Estrela da Amadora players